The 2006 Men's World Open Squash Championship is the men's edition of the World Open, which serves as the individual world championship for squash players. The event took place just in front of the pyramids in Cairo in Egypt from 1 September to 6 September 2006. David Palmer won his second World Open title, defeating Grégory Gaultier in the final.

Ranking points
In 2006, the points breakdown were as follows:

Seeds

Draws & Results

See also
 World Open
 2006 Women's World Open Squash Championship

References

External links
 World Open 2006 SquashSite website

World Squash Championships
W
2006 in Egyptian sport
2000s in Cairo
Squash tournaments in Egypt
Sports competitions in Cairo
International sports competitions hosted by Egypt